The Healthcare Quality Association on Accreditation (HQAA) is a US not-for-profit health care accrediting body and is an alternative to the Accreditation Commission for Health Care and Joint Commission. The organization provides an accreditation option specifically designed with the durable medical equipment (DME).

Headquartered in Waterloo, Iowa, HQAA was developed following passage of the Medicare Modernization Act of 2003. It has been awarded Medicare deeming status for DME accreditation.

See also
Hospital accreditation 
International healthcare accreditation
List of healthcare accreditation organisations in the USA
Patient safety 
Patient safety organization

References

External links
Official web page
Healthcare Quality Association on Accreditation (HQAA), by the VGM Group
Accreditation, by Global Media Marketing

Healthcare accreditation organizations in the United States
Medical and health organizations based in Iowa
Medicare and Medicaid (United States)
Quality assurance organizations